Jon Richt (born March 11, 1990) is an American football coach and former player. He was the quarterbacks coach for the University of Miami Hurricanes football team from 2016 to 2018, where he assisted his father, Miami head coach Mark Richt.

Playing career 
Jon Richt was a high school quarterback at Prince Avenue Christian School in Bogart, Georgia, near Athens, where his father coached at the University of Georgia. He began his college career at Clemson University, where he spent a redshirt year, then transferred to Mars Hill College (now University). At Mars Hill, Richt started every game as a senior, and set program records in completions, attempts, yards, and touchdown passes.

Coaching career

Georgia
Richt spent the 2014 season serving on his father Mark Richt's Georgia Bulldogs coaching staff as a quality control assistant.
During the 2014 campaign, Georgia posted a 10-3 overall record and went 6-2 in Southeastern Conference play, placing second in the East Division.
The 2014 season was a record-breaking year for the Bulldogs’ offensive unit as Georgia posted 537 points and averaged 41.3 points per game - both of which were school records. Georgia’s 41.3 points per game ranked eighth in the NCAA.

Buffalo Bills
In 2015, Richt joined the NFL's Buffalo Bills as an entry-level assistant on new head coach Rex Ryan's first staff. During his lone season in Buffalo, the Bills posted an 8-8 record.

Miami
Following the 2015 season, Mark Richt was fired from Georgia and accepted the head coaching job at the University of Miami. On January 2, 2016, Jon Richt joined his father's staff as quarterbacks coach, a position he held for his father's entire three-year tenure.
Jon Richt was fired along with the entire Miami offensive coaching staff soon after Manny Diaz took over as head coach.

References

1990 births
Living people
Georgia Bulldogs football coaches
Miami Hurricanes football coaches
Buffalo Bills coaches
Sports coaches from Georgia (U.S. state)